refers to a type of Japanese pottery produced in the region around the towns of Nagayo in Nagasaki Prefecture, western Japan.

Nagayo ware has links to Kameyama ware. During the Edo period, a number of high-quality ceramic vessels were produced that employed the sancai (三彩; literally: "three colours") type of decoration, which mainly used, but was not limited to, the three colors of brown, green, and a creamy off-white.

References

External links 
 http://kapitan.b1388.jp/article/0041278.html
 http://www.city.isahaya.nagasaki.jp/post69/1720.html
 http://www.city.isahaya.nagasaki.jp/post07/16486.html

Japanese pottery
Culture in Nagasaki Prefecture

ja:長与焼